Blue Cross may refer to:

Human healthcare
Blue Cross Blue Shield Association, a federation of health insurance providers in the United States
Canadian Association of Blue Cross Plans, a federation of health insurance providers in Canada
International Federation of the Blue Cross, a Christian organization engaged in the prevention, treatment and aftercare of problems related to alcohol and other drugs

Charities for animal healthcare and welfare
Blue Cross (animal charity), an animal charity in the United Kingdom
Irish Blue Cross, an animal charity in Ireland
Blue Cross of India, an animal charity in India
Blue Cross Zimbabwe, an organization associated with the Zimbabwe Society for the Prevention of Cruelty to Animals

Buildings
Blue Cross Blue Shield Tower, a building located in Chicago, Illinois, home to the headquarters of Health Care Service Corporation
Blue Cross Centre, an office building located in the central business district of Moncton, New Brunswick
Blue Cross Arena, a multi-purpose indoor arena, located in Rochester, New York

Other uses
Blue Cross (chemical warfare), a World War I chemical warfare agent
"The Blue Cross" (short story), a short story by G. K. Chesterton
Blue Cross (society), a Finnish nazi organisation 
"Blue Cross", a song by P-MODEL from Potpourri

See also
Cruz Azul, a soccer club in Mexico
Modrý kríž, a Christian teetotalers' society founded in Slovakia at the end of the 19th century